Salehabad (also Romanized as Şāleḩābād; also known as Sālīhābād) is a city and capital of Salehabad District, in Bahar County, Hamadan Province, Iran. At the 2006 census, its population was 7,708, in 1,974 families.

References

Populated places in Bahar County

Cities in Hamadan Province